Rajpur may refer to several places in India and Nepal :

India 
 Rajpur, Bihar Assembly constituency
 Rajpur, Narkatiaganj, a village in West Champaran, Bihar
 Rajpur, Siwan, a village in Siwan, Bihar
 Rajpur, Balrampur, a block in Chhattisgarh
 Rajpur, Baroda, a former princely state under the Baroda Residency (now in Gujarat)
 Rajpur (Kathiawar), a former princely state of the Kathiawar Agency
 Rajpur, Sonipat, a village in Haryana
 Rajpur Gomtipur, a neighbourhood of Ahmedabad, Gujarat
 Rajpur, Madhya Pradesh, a town in Barwani District of Madhya Pradesh
 Rajpur tehsil
 Rajpur, Madhya Pradesh (Vidhan Sabha constituency)
 Rajpur, Ramabai Nagar, in Uttar Pradesh
 Rajpur, Sonbhadra, a village in Uttar Pradesh
 Rajpur, Varanasi, a village in Uttar Pradesh
 Rajpur, Dehradun, in Uttarakhand
 Rajpur (Uttarakhand Assembly constituency)
 Rajpur, Udham Singh Nagar, in Uttarakhand
 Rajpur Sonarpur, part of greater Kolkata, West Bengal
 Rajpur Dhansoi panchayat
 Rajpur, Chatra, a village in Jharkhand

Nepal 
 Rajpur, Lumbini, a town in Kapilvastu district
 Rajpur, Rapti, a town in Dang Deokhuri district
 Rajpur, Sagarmatha, a town in Siraha district
 Rajpur Farhadawa, a town in Rautahat district
 Rajpur Tulsi, a town in Rautahat district

See also 
 Alirajpur (or Rajpur), city and former princely state in India
 Raipur (disambiguation)
 Rajapur (disambiguation)